Ida Orloff (also written Ida Orlov, pseudonym of Ida Siegler von Eberswald; 16 February 1889 – 9 April 1945) was a theater and silent film actress during the early 20th century. She was already "renowned for her performances of modern high literature at leading German theaters", according to historians Jennifer Kapczynski and Michael Richardson, before she starred in the classic Danish silent film Atlantis, which was based upon the 1912 novel by Gerhardt Hauptmann. It was discovered years later that Orloff had been a secret lover and an inspirational muse for Hauptmann, who won the 1912 Nobel Prize for Literature. She met and began a relationship with him in 1905.

Life and career
Born on 16 February 1889 in St. Petersburg, Russia as Ida Margaretha Weißbeck, Ida Weißbeck was a daughter of Georg Weißbeck, a brewery manager who had emigrated from Prussia's province of Hesse to Russia. Following her father's death, circa 1895, she relocated with her two siblings and mother, a native of Heidelberg, Germany, to Germany and then to Vienna, Austria. After her mother remarried to Austrian army captain Heinrich von Siegler, Edler von Eberswald, Ida Weißbeck's name was changed to Ida Siegler von Eberswald. Educated initially in a convent, she pursued advanced training at Vienna's Ottosche Theaterschule following her stepfather's death.

She began her acting career in the world of theater, and ultimately adopted the stage name of Ida Orloff. In 1905, she met and began a relationship with novelist Gerhardt Hauptmann, ultimately becoming his muse. He frequently signed his letters to her as "Your Wann" in reference to a character in his work, And Pippa Dances. She last met Hauptmann in 1942, at a grand reception hosted by the government in honour of his 80th birthday.

On 9 April 1945, while the Battle of Vienna was raging only a few miles away, Ida Orloff committed suicide at her home in the suburb of Tullnerbach, fearing reports of widespread rape and looting by the advancing Soviet Army.

Filmography
Atlantis (1913)
 Baccarat (1919)

References

External links 
 Ida Orloff -- The Androom Archives

Austrian silent film actresses
Austrian stage actresses
Baltic-German people
Austrian people of Russian descent
Austrian people of German descent
Actresses from Saint Petersburg
1889 births
1945 deaths
Emigrants from the Russian Empire to Austria-Hungary
20th-century Austrian actresses
1945 suicides
Suicides in Austria